Roman is a 2006 suspense-horror film directed by Angela Bettis and starring Lucky McKee (who also wrote the script) as Roman.

Plot
Roman (Lucky McKee) is a lonely young man who yearns to find love, happiness and companionship. Tormented by his ungrateful co-workers and trapped in a life of tedium as a welder in a local factory, Roman's one pleasure is his obsession with the elusive beauty (Kristen Bell) who lives in another apartment in his building complex. When a chance encounter with the young woman goes horribly wrong, a moment of frenzied desperation triggers a chilling turn of events leading to the girl's murder. As he teeters between deranged fantasy and cold reality, Roman's struggle to hide his grisly secret is further complicated by an eccentric neighbor named Eva (Nectar Rose) who develops an unlikely attraction to Roman and forces herself into his dark and tortured world.

Cast
 Lucky McKee as Roman
 Kristen Bell as Isis
 Nectar Rose as Eva
 Ben Boyer as Russ
 Mike McKee as Leroy Lof
 Jesse Hlubik as Jesse
 Chris Sivertson as Lank Worker
 Eddie Steeples as Detective

External links 
 
 

American horror thriller films
2006 films
2000s thriller films
2006 horror films
2006 directorial debut films
2000s English-language films
2000s American films